Gymnogyps amplus is an extinct species of large New World vulture in the family Cathartidae. The species was first described by Loye H. Miller (1911) in 1911 from a partial tarsometatarsus recovered from Pleistocene cave deposits in Samwel Cave of northern California. Harvey I. Fisher (1944) designated a set of plesiotypes from the Rancho La Brea which includes a cranium, rostrum, and mandible.

The species is the only condor species found in the La Brea Tar Pits' Pit 10, which fossils date to "a Holocene radiocarbon age of 9,000 years." The smaller, modern California condor may have evolved from G. amplus.

References

a
Pleistocene birds of North America
Fossil taxa described in 1911
Taxa named by Loye H. Miller